Special Effects Stage (known as Special Effects Stages from 2002 to 2010, Special Effects Stage from 2010 to 2015, and Special Effects Show from 2016 to 2023) was an attraction at Universal Studios Hollywood. Originally located in the park's Lower Lot area, it was relocated to the Upper Lot’s Castle Theater to make way for Transformers: The Ride 3D. The attraction opened in this second and final location on June 26, 2010. The show permanently closed on January 8, 2023 and will be replaced by what is rumored to be a Fast & the Furious-themed rollercoaster. 

The attraction took guests through demonstrations of how movie special effects are created, including Motion capture, Chroma key, and Stop motion techniques. It included sections with park guest participation, and lifted elements from Universal's Horror Make-Up Show at Universal Studios Florida. The live attraction had two hosts: an older, practical effects guru and a younger, digital effects artist.

Films featured 
The attraction's structure and the films showcased within it changed overtime. The show's first and final performances consisted of:

First performance (January 2002) 

 Stage 1 (The Virtual Studio): Jurassic Park, The Mummy Returns, Gladiator
 Stage 2 (The Creature Factory): Dr. Seuss’ How the Grinch Stole Christmas!, The Nutty Professor, The Mummy, Child's Play, Jurassic Park, Frankenstein, The Phantom of the Opera
 Stage 3 (Sound Stage): U-571, Shrek, Scorpion King

Final performance (January 8, 2023) 
Jurassic World, E.T. the Extra-Terrestrial, King Kong, Jurassic Park, Minions, The Incredible Hulk, The Mummy, Back to the Future, Ted, The Secret Life of Pets, Jaws, Sing, Apollo 13, The Fast and the Furious, The Bourne Identity, Identity Thief, Dracula, Child's Play

History 
Before this show's opening in 2002, various other special effect-centric shows took place in the park's lower-lot area from the 1970s to 1990s, including:

 The Six Million Dollar Man Bionic Testing Center
 Special Effects Stage/2010 Special Effects Stage
 World of Cinemagic (The Magic of Hitchcock, Back to the Future Special Effects Stage, and Harry and the Hendersons Sound Effects Show) Some of these shows were included within the park's Backlot Tour, and some were stand-alone attractions.

See also
 Lights! Camera! Action! Hosted by Steven Spielberg
 Movie Magic Special Effects Show

References

Amusement park attractions introduced in 2010
Universal Studios Hollywood
Universal Parks & Resorts attractions by name
2010 establishments in California
2023 disestablishments in California